Joseph Robert Fourqurean (January 6, 1950 – November 19, 2013) was a Canadian football player who played for the BC Lions. He played college football at Bluefield State College. Fourqurean was named to the BC Lions Wall of Fame in 2011.

References

1950 births
2013 deaths
People from Covington, Virginia
Players of American football from Virginia
Bluefield State Big Blues football players
BC Lions players
Canadian football defensive backs